M7GpppX diphosphatase (DcpS, m7GpppX pyrophosphatase, m7GpppN m7GMP phosphohydrolase) is an enzyme with systematic name m7G5'ppp5'N m7GMP phosphohydrolase. This enzyme catalyses the following chemical reaction

 (1) m7G5'ppp5'N(3'ppp5'N)n + H2O  7-methylguanosine 5'-phosphate + pp5'N(3'ppp5'N)n
 (2) 7-methylguanosine 5'-diphosphate + H2O  7-methylguanosine 5'-phosphate + phosphate

Decapping is a process in the control of eukaryotic mRNA degradation.

References

External links 
 

EC 3.6.1